Raja Raghuraj Singh Stadium is a cricket ground is Bilaspur, Chhattisgarh. The stadium has hosted three Ranji matches in 1978, 1979 and 1981 between Madhya Pradesh cricket team against Vidarbha cricket team and two games against Railways cricket team.

See also

 International Hockey Stadium, Rajnandgaon
 Jayanti Stadium
 Pandit Ravishankar Shukla Stadium
 Raipur International Hockey Stadium
 Shaheed Veer Narayan Singh International Cricket Stadium

References

External links 
 Cricketarchive
 Cricinfo
 Wikimapia

Bilaspur, Chhattisgarh
Buildings and structures in Chhattisgarh
Multi-purpose stadiums in India
Sports venues in Chhattisgarh
Cricket grounds in Chhattisgarh
Sports venues completed in 1978
1978 establishments in Madhya Pradesh
20th-century architecture in India